In enzymology, a polyphosphate-glucose phosphotransferase is an enzyme that catalyzes the chemical reaction.

(phosphate)n + D-glucose  (phosphate)n-1 + D-glucose 6-phosphate

Thus, the two substrates of this enzyme are (phosphate)n and D-glucose, whereas its two products are (phosphate)n-1 and D-glucose 6-phosphate.

This enzyme belongs to the family of transferases, specifically those transferring phosphorus-containing groups (phosphotransferases) with an alcohol group as acceptor. The systematic name of this enzyme class is polyphosphate:D-glucose 6-phosphotransferase. Other names in common use include polyphosphate glucokinase, polyphosphate-D-(+)-glucose-6-phosphotransferase, and polyphosphate-glucose 6-phosphotransferase.  This enzyme participates in glycolysis / gluconeogenesis.  It employs one cofactor, neutral salt.

References 

 
 

EC 2.7.1
Enzymes of known structure